The year 1943 in television involved some significant events.
Below is a list of television-related events during 1943.



Events
May 8 – Opening of Paris Télévision – Fernsehsender Paris, a channel operated by German occupation authorities (Kurt Hinzmann, former director of Fernsehsender "Paul Nipkow") after an agreement between Telefunken and Compagnie des Compteurs, with a (German) 441-line standard. Local French programmes and Fernsehsender "Paul Nipkow" programmes are interlaced. 
 June – Work is begun for the U.S. Army Air Forces to develop a remotely controlled glide bomb guided by a radio receiver and a television transmitter using a 625-line iconoscope tube. The first are completed in July and tested in August.
December 23 – The first complete opera, Hansel and Gretel, is telecast, by WRGB in Schenectady.
The American Broadcasting Company (ABC) is formed. Its television network debuts in 1948.
Germany experiments with a flying bomb guided by a television camera, created by Fernseh, using both the Superikonoscope and the Farnsworth image dissector.

Debuts
 The Voice of Firestone Televues (1943–1947; renamed The Voice of Firestone, broadcast from 1949 to 1963).
 April 18 -  Your Victory Garden debuts on W2XVW (Dumont) (1943)

Television shows

Births
January 1 
Don Novello, actor, Saturday Night Live
Stanley Kamel, actor (died 2008)
January 13 – Richard Moll, actor, Night Court
January 14 - Holland Taylor, actress, The Practice, Two and a Half Men
January 18 - Paul Angelis, actor (d. 2009)
January 23 – Gil Gerard, actor, Buck Rogers in the 25th Century
January 24 – Sharon Tate, actress, model (d. 1969)
January 26 - Kathryn Leigh Scott, actress, Dark Shadows
January 28 – John Beck, actor, Flamingo Road
January 31 - Peter McRobbie, actor, Law & Order, Daredevil
February 1 - Tina Sloan, actress, Guiding Light
February 3 - Blythe Danner, actress, Huff
February 5 - Michael Mann, producer
February 8 - Creed Bratton, actor, The Office
February 17 – Claire Malis, actress (d. 2012)
February 25 - George Harrison, English singer-songwriter, The Beatles (d. 2001)
February 27 – Mary Frann, actress, Newhart (d. 1998)
March 8 
Susan Clark, Canadian actress, Webster
Lynn Redgrave, actress (died 2010)
March 9 - Charles Gibson, American broadcast television anchor
March 16 – Susan Bay, actress
March 18 – Kevin Dobson, actor, Kojak (died 2020)
March 23 - Alan Kalter, announcer (died 2021)
March 25 - Paul Michael Glaser, actor, director, Starsky & Hutch
March 28 - Conchata Ferrell, actress, Two and a Half Men (died 2020)
March 29 – Eric Idle, actor, comedian, Monty Python's Flying Circus
March 31 - Christopher Walken, actor
April 2 - Antonio Sabàto Sr., actor (died 2021)
April 5 - Max Gail, actor, Barney Miller
April 11 - Harley Race, professional wrestler (died 2019)
April 23 - Hervé Villechaize, actor (died 1993)
April 24 - Richard Sterban, singer
April 25 - Tony Christie, singer
April 26 - Gary Wright, singer
April 29 - Duane Allen, singer
April 30 - Bobby Vee, singer (died 2016)
May 10 - David Clennon, actor, thirtysomething
May 12 - Linda Dano, actress, One Life to Live, Another World
May 24 – Gary Burghoff, actor, M*A*S*H
May 27 – Bruce Weitz, actor, Hill Street Blues
May 30 – Charles Collingwood, actor
May 31 
Joe Namath, football player
Sharon Gless, actress, Cagney and Lacey
June 1 - John Langley, creator of Cops (died 2021)
June 2 - Charles Haid, actor and director, Hill Street Blues
June 3 - Camilla Sparv, actress
June 7
Ken Osmond, American actor and police officer, Leave It to Beaver (died 2020)
Michael Pennington, English actor and director
June 13 – Malcolm McDowell, actor
June 15 – Lee Shallat Chemel, producer
June 16 – Joan Van Ark, actress, Knots Landing
June 17 – Newt Gingrich, politician
June 22 – Brit Hume, journalist
June 24 – Georg Stanford Brown, Cuban-American actor, The Rookies
June 26 – John Beasley, actor, Everwood
July 2 – Lauri Peters, actress
July 3 – Kurtwood Smith, actor, That '70s Show
July 4 – Geraldo Rivera, television host
July 8 – Ri Chun-hee, North Korean news presenter
July 9 – Suzanne Rogers, actress, Days of Our Lives
July 11 – Susan Seaforth Hayes, actress, Days of Our Lives, The Young and the Restless
July 12 – Ernie Anastos, news anchor
July 23 
Lucy Lee Flippin, actress, Little House on the Prairie
Bob Hilton, game show host
July 29 – Roz Kelly, actress, Happy Days
August 2 – Max Wright, actor, ALF
August 6 – Michael Anderson Jr., actor
August 12 - Jim Storm, actor, Dark Shadows
August 13 - Lillian Hurst, actress, Lost
August 17 - Robert De Niro, actor
August 18 - Martin Mull, actor, Roseanne, Sabrina the Teenage Witch, Danny Phantom
August 27 - Tuesday Weld, actress, The Many Loves of Dobie Gillis
August 28 - David Soul, American-British actor and singer, Starsky & Hutch
August 30 - Altovise Davis, American actress (died 2009)
September 9 - Art LaFleur, American actor (died 2021)
September 21 - Jerry Bruckheimer, American film and television producer
September 25
Lee Aaker, actor, The Adventures of Rin Tin Tin (d. 2021)
Josh Taylor, actor, Days of Our Lives, The Hogan Family
Robert Walden, actor, Lou Grant, Brothers, Happily Divorced
September 27 - Peter Simon, actor, Guiding Light
October 6 - Michael Durrell, actor, Guiding Light
October 8 
Chevy Chase, actor, comedian, Saturday Night Live, Community
R. L. Stine, television producer
October 12 - Lin Shaye, actress
October 13 - Mike Barnicle, anchor
October 15
Noreen Corcoran, actress (d. 2016)
Penny Marshall, actress, director, Laverne and Shirley (d. 2018)
October 17 – Elaine Taylor, actress
October 27 – Carmen Argenziano, actor, Stargate SG-1 (d. 2019)
October 29 – Don Simpson, film producer (died 1996)
November 4 – Chuck Scarborough, television journalist
November 6 – Ian Turpie, actor (died 2012)
November 12 – Wallace Shawn, actor
November 17 – Lauren Hutton, actress
November 20 – Veronica Hamel, actress, Hill Street Blues
November 26 – Bruce Paltrow, television and film director
November 28 – Randy Newman, singer
December 1 – David Salzman, producer
December 12 – E. Jean Carroll, author
December 16 – Steven Bochco, writer-producer, Hill Street Blues (d. 2018)
December 23 – Harry Shearer, actor, Saturday Night Live, The Simpsons
December 27 – Cokie Roberts, political journalist (d. 2019)
December 28 – Richard Whiteley, presenter (d. 2005)
December 31 – Ben Kingsley, actor

Deaths
January 7 - Nikola Tesla, inventor of the Tesla coil (born 1856)

References

 
TV